Orthotrichaceae is the only family of mosses in the order Orthotrichales. Many species in the family are epiphytic.

Classification
Cardotiella
Ceuthotheca
Codonoblepharon
Desmotheca
Florschuetziella
Groutiella
Leiomitrium
Leptodontiopsis
Leratia
Macrocoma
Macromitrium
Matteria
Nyholmiella
Orthotrichum
Pentastichella
Pleurorthotrichum
Schlotheimia
Sehnemobryum
Stoneobryum
Ulota
Zygodon

References

Moss families
Orthotrichales